Neş'e Erdok (born 1940 in Istanbul, Turkey) is a Turkish painter.

She is a contemporary-figurative artist, known for painting distorted figures with large hands and feet.

References

Living people
1940 births
Artists from Istanbul
Turkish women painters
20th-century Turkish women artists
21st-century Turkish women artists